Colin Fraser may refer to:

Colin Fraser (Australian politician) (died 1877), Australian politician
Colin Fraser (Canadian politician) (born 1978), Canadian politician
Colin Fraser (ice hockey) (born 1985), Canadian professional ice hockey player
Colin Fraser (rugby league) (born 1963), Australian rugby league player
Colin Fraser (mining) (1875–1944), mining engineer and executive